Memory effect, also known as battery effect, lazy battery effect, or battery memory, is an effect observed in nickel-cadmium rechargeable batteries that causes them to hold less charge. It describes the situation in which nickel-cadmium batteries gradually lose their maximum energy capacity if they are repeatedly recharged after being only partially discharged. The battery appears to "remember" the smaller capacity.

True memory effect
The term "memory" came from an aerospace nickel-cadmium application in which the cells were repeatedly discharged to 25% of available capacity (give or take 1%) by exacting computer control, then recharged to 100% capacity without overcharge. This long-term, repetitive cycle régime, with no provision for overcharge, resulted in a loss of capacity beyond the 25% discharge point. True memory cannot exist if any one (or more) of the following conditions holds:
 batteries achieve full overcharge.
 discharge is not exactly the same each cycle, within plus or minus 3%
 discharge is to less than 1.0 volt per cell

True memory-effect is specific to sintered-plate nickel-cadmium cells, and is exceedingly difficult to reproduce, especially in lower ampere-hour cells. In one particular test program designed to induce the effect, none was found after more than 700 precisely-controlled charge/discharge cycles. In the program, spirally-wound one-ampere-hour cells were used. In a follow-up program, 20-ampere-hour aerospace-type cells were used on a similar test régime; memory effects were observed after a few hundred cycles.

Other problems perceived as memory effect
Phenomena which are not true memory effects may also occur in battery types other than sintered-plate nickel-cadmium cells. In particular, lithium-based cells, not normally subject to the memory effect, may change their voltage levels so that a virtual decrease of capacity may be perceived by the battery control system.

Temporary effects

Voltage depression due to long-term over-charging
A common process often ascribed to memory effect is voltage depression. In this case, the output voltage of the battery drops more quickly than normal as it is used, even though the total capacity remains almost the same. In modern electronic equipment that monitors the voltage to indicate battery charge, the battery appears to be draining very quickly. To the user, it appears the battery is not holding its full charge, which seems similar to memory effect. This is a common problem with high-load devices such as digital cameras and cell phones.

Voltage depression is caused by repeated over-charging of a battery, which causes the formation of small crystals of electrolyte on the plates. These can clog the plates, increasing resistance and lowering the voltage of some individual cells in the battery. This causes the battery as a whole to seem to discharge rapidly as those individual cells discharge quickly and the voltage of the battery as a whole suddenly falls. This effect is very common, as consumer trickle chargers typically overcharge. Nickel–metal hydride batteries, for example, are known to experience this form of capacity loss often mistakenly attributed to memory effect.

Repair
The effect can be overcome by subjecting each cell of the battery to one or more deep charge/discharge cycles. This must be done to the individual cells, not a multi-cell battery; in a battery, some cells may discharge before others, resulting in those cells being subjected to a reverse charging current by the remaining cells, potentially leading to irreversible damage.

High temperatures
High temperatures can also reduce the charged voltage and the charge accepted by the cells.

Other causes
 Operation below 32 °F (0 °C)
 High discharge rates (above 5C) in a battery not specifically designed for such use
 Inadequate charging time
 Defective charger

Permanent loss of capacity

Deep discharge
Some rechargeable batteries can be damaged by repeated deep discharge. Batteries are composed of multiple similar, but not identical, cells. Each cell has its own charge capacity. As the battery as a whole is being deeply discharged, the cell with the smallest capacity may reach zero charge and will "reverse charge" as the other cells continue to force current through it.  The resulting loss of capacity is often ascribed to the memory effect.

Battery users may attempt to avoid the memory effect proper by fully discharging their battery packs. This practice is likely to cause more damage as one of the cells will be deep discharged. The damage is focused on the weakest cell, so that each additional full discharge will cause more and more damage to that cell.

Age and use—normal end-of-life
All rechargeable batteries have a finite lifespan and will slowly lose storage capacity as they age due to secondary chemical reactions within the battery whether it is used or not.  Some cells may fail sooner than others, but the effect is to reduce the voltage of the battery. Lithium-based batteries have one of the longest idle lives of any construction.  Unfortunately the number of operational cycles is still quite low at approximately 400–1200 complete charge/discharge cycles. The lifetime of lithium batteries decreases at higher temperature and states of charge (SoC), whether used or not; maximum life of lithium cells when not in use(storage) is achieved by refrigerating (without freezing) charged to 30%–50% SoC. To prevent overdischarge, battery should be brought back to room temperature and recharged to 50% SoC once every six months or once per year.

References

Further reading
 Rechargeable Batteries Applications Handbook from Gates Energy Products, published since 1992 April 10.

Battery charging
Rechargeable batteries